Govindan Aravindan (23 January 1935 – 15 March 1991) was an Indian film director, screenwriter, musician, cartoonist, and painter. He was one of the pioneers of parallel cinema in Malayalam. He was known for his unorthodox way of filmmaking; he changed his cinematic forms consistently and experimented in storytelling without regular narrative styles. He studied at University College, Trivandrum. Before venturing into the film field, he was an established cartoonist. He had also worked with documentaries and theatre. He also occasionally directed music for other filmmakers. The Government of India awarded him the fourth highest civilian award of Padma Shri in 1990.

Biography
G. Aravindan was the son of comedy writer M. N. Govindan Nair. Aravindan started his professional life as a cartoonist for the journal Mathrubhumi. He established himself as a cartoonist in the early 1960s with his cartoon series Cheriya Manushyarum Valiya Lokavum which dealt with the social encounters of its central characters, Ramu and Guruji, mingled with political and social satire. After that series ended in 1973, he drew cartoons for other journals but these were very sporadic. At one point, Aravindan diverted his attention to theatre and music. He played a major role in establishing theatre and music clubs Navarangam and Sopanam. He became associated with eminent theatre figure Kavalam Narayana Panicker which accelerated his activities in the field of professional play. They created several plays like Kaali and Avanavan Kadamba. Aravindan was working as an officer in the Rubber Board when he got associated with artist Devan, playwright Thikkodiyan and writer Pattathuvila Karunakaran. The early works of Aravindan were influenced by the group; for example, the spiritualism factor which can be seen in his early works can be attributed to satirist Sanjayan and mystic paintings of K. C. S. Paniker.

The first film directed by Aravindan, Uttarayanam (1974), came out as a product from this group; the film was produced by Karunakaran and the story was written by Thikkodiyan. The film, which exposes opportunism and hypocrisy set against the backdrop of the Independence struggle, was inspired by Aravindan's own cartoon series Cheriya Lokavum Valiya Manushyarum (Small World and Big People). The film is about Ravi, an unemployed young man, who has to face a series of encounters during his search for a job. Ravi reflects on the past struggles of the anti-British freedom fighters he has learned about from his paralyzed father. He eventually meets Gopalan Muthalaly, a leader of Quit India movement, but now a corrupt contractor. The film garnered wide critical praise and several awards, including five Kerala State Film Awards upon release.

Aravindan's second film Kanchana Sita (1972) was an adaptation of C. N. Sreekantan Nair's play of the same name, which is a reworking of Valmiki's Ramayana. The film is credited with formation of a new stream called independent filmmaking in Malayalam. It interprets a story from the Uttara Kanda of the epic poem, where Rama sends his wife, Sita, to the jungle to satisfy his subjects. Director Aravindan interweaves the Samkhya-Yoga philosophical concepts of Prakriti-Purusha bonds throughout the film. The film, told in a feminist perspective, significantly differs from all other adaptations of Ramayana in the characterisation of the central characters, including Rama and Lakshmana. The characters are humanised, contrary to the way divine characters from Indian mythology are usually depicted in visual media. The film was shot in the interior tribal areas of Andhra Pradesh and the roles of the epic heroes are played by Rama Chenchu tribal people (or Koyas), who claim lineage to the mythological Rama. Upper-class Hindu groups accused of Aravindan of blasphemy for casting tribals in the role of Hindu epic heroes but Aravindan never heeded saying that the Rama Chenchus have classical features and are marvellous actors.

While Kanchana Sita dealt with mythology, Aravindan's next film Thampu (1978) dealt with realism and told the story of suffering in a circus troupe. It was shot in black and white in a direct documentary mode. Aravindan won the award for Best Director at both National Film Awards and Kerala State Film Awards.

His 1979 films Kummatty and Esthappan also ran through different streams. Kummatty is a Pied Piper-like figment of Malabar's folklore about a partly mythic and partly real magician called Kummatty (bogeyman) while Esthappan blends together the Biblical story of the deeds of Christ and the way society responded to him, with the life of Esthappan, whose life mystified others. Indefinability of the human mind was the theme of his next film Pokkuveyil (1981). The music for this film was composed by flautist Hariprasad Chaurasia. The legend is that visuals of this film were composed according to musical notations, without any script. The protagonist of the film is a young artist who lives with his father, a radical friend, a sportsman and a music-loving young woman. His world collapses when his father dies, the radical friend leaves him, the sportsman friend gets injured in an accident and has to give up sports and her family takes the woman away to another city. The lead role was played by poet Balachandran Chullikkadu.

His next film Chidambaram came after a gap of four years. The 1985 film was an adaptation of a short story by C. V. Sreeraman and was produced by Aravindan under the banner Suryakanthi. The film explores various aspects of relations between men and women through the lives of three people living in a cattle farm in the hilly areas on the border of Kerala and Tamil Nadu. Themes of guilt and redemption are also dealt with. Unlike earlier films directed by Aravindan, Chidambaram featured a cast consisting of many popular actors: Bharath Gopi, Smita Patil, Sreenivasan and Mohandas play the lead roles.

In 1986 Oridathu can be seen as a continuation of Aravindan's earlier film Thampu and his cartoon series Cheriya Manushyarum Valiya Lokavum (The Small Man and the Big World). The story is about the problems faced by the people of a hamlet with no electricity, when electric supply finally reaches them. The film reaches a conclusion that life is better without electricity. Though the film is discussing a serious issue, the treatment of it is very simplistic. Humour and intensity characterise the film that is set in the mid-fifties. The film is different from many of Aravindan's earlier works in that it deals with a broad range of characters and lacks a clear-cut linear story. The theme of Oridathu demanded a caricature treatment so Aravindan made it that way. When asked about this deviation, Aravindan stated, "There is an element of caricature in all the characters. A little exaggeration and lot of humour was consciously introduced to make effective the last sequence, which is the explosion. In fact the whole film moves towards the climax — the clash on the day of the festival and the breaking out of the fire." The film is complex in that it has many characters and many incidents and therefore does not have a single motif. Hence, Aravindan had to use a number of shots in the film. The usual type of music is also absent. Instead, the sounds of the incidents are used to the maximum. In the film, different characters speak different dialects of Malayalam, for example the villagers speak pure Valluvanadan Malayalam of South Malabar, the overseer uses the Trivandrum Malayalam the fake Doctor uses Travancore Malayalam etc.

In this period Aravindan did a number of documentaries and short films. He composed music for films like Aaro Oral, Piravi and Ore Thooval Pakshikal. Aravindan's 1989 feature film Unni was an international co-production loosely based on experiences in Kerala of a group of American students, who played themselves. Aravindan's final project Vasthuhara (1991) about refugees in Bengal was based on C. V. Sreeraman's short story in the same name. The film had Mohanlal and Neena Gupta in major roles.

Aravindan died on 15 March 1991, before the release of Vasthuhara. The cause of death was a heart attack. He was aged just 56 when he died.

Kerala Chalachitra Film Society facilitates Aravindan Puraskaram every year in the memory of G. Aravindan for the best debutant director in Indian languages.

Awards

Civilian awards
 Padma Shri

National Film Awards
 1974: Award for the Best Feature Film on the 25th Anniversary of India's Independence – Uttarayanam
 1974: Best Feature Film in Malayalam – Uttarayanam
 1978: Best Direction – Kanchana Sita
 1979: Best Direction – Thampu
 1986: Best Film – Chidambaram
 1987: Best Direction – Oridathu
 1991: Best Feature Film in Malayalam – Vasthuhara

Kerala State Film Awards
 1974: Best Film – Uttarayanam
 1974: Best Director – Uttarayanam
 1974: Best Screenplay – Uttarayanam
 1978: Second Best Film – Thampu
 1978: Best Director – Thampu
 1979: Best Film – Esthappan
 1979: Best Children's Film – Kummatty
 1979: Best Director – Esthappan
 1981: Best Director – Pokkuveyil
 1985: Best Film – Chidambaram
 1985: Best Director – Chidambaram
 1985: Best Documentary – The Brown Landscape
 1986: Best Film – Oridathu
 1986: Best Director – Oridathu
 1986: Best Documentary – The Catch
 1988: Best Music Director – Ore Thooval Pakshikal
 1990: Best Film – Vasthuhara
 1990: Best Director – Vasthuhara

Kerala Film Critics Association Awards
 1978: Best Film – Thampu
 1978: Best Director – Thampu
 1979: Best Children's Film – Kummatty

Filmography

Direction

Notes
 He also wrote the story of Esthappan and dialogues for Vasthuhara.

Other contributions

References

External links

Aravindan (Memoir by Chintha Ravi published in 1991) (in Malayalam)
G. Aravindan—Sahapedia article by V.K. Cherian
Aravindan—Sahapedia essay by Sasikumar Vasudevan

1935 births
1991 deaths
Indian cartoonists
Musicians from Kottayam
Artists from Kottayam
Malayalam film directors
Kerala State Film Award winners
University College Thiruvananthapuram alumni
Indian documentary filmmakers
Best Director National Film Award winners
Recipients of the Padma Shri in arts
Painters from Kerala
Screenwriters from Kerala
20th-century Indian film directors
20th-century Indian musicians
20th-century Indian painters
Film directors from Kerala
Malayalam screenwriters
Producers who won the Best Feature Film National Film Award
Directors who won the Best Feature Film National Film Award
20th-century Indian screenwriters